Shej Roi R. Sumang (born December 12, 1990) is a Filipino professional basketball player for the NorthPort Batang Pier of the Philippine Basketball Association (PBA).

Early life and high school career
He is the eldest of six children of Jess and Sheila Sumang. He grew up in the streets of Tondo, and already played basketball when he was a kid.  He played for the Letran Squires in high school, where he became teammates with future PBA player Kevin Alas. He attended tryouts in Ateneo and San Beda, but he chose UE  upon the proddings of former UE star and current PBA player Paul Lee, a fellow Tondo native. He dropped out of high school and was an out-of-school youth for two years playing pickup basketball games in different places, but his father convinced him to go back to school and play varsity ball.

College career
Sumang first played for the UE Red Warriors in 2011. In his rookie year, he only averaged 5.2 points, 3.4 rebounds and 2.8 assist per game. The next season, he was the one of the league leaders in several categories: third in scoring average (18.4 ppg), second in assists (4.9 apg), and fifth in steals (1.4 spg). In 2013, he increased his scoring average to 19.33 ppg, second in the league behind season MVP Terrence Romeo. He was included in the Mythical 5 selection for that same year. When Derrick Pumaren took the coaching reins for the Red Warriors in 2014, his scoring average dipped down to 13.0 points per outing, and was always at odds with his new coach. At one point, he was benched by Pumaren for leaving the school’s quarters without permission, and was relegated to come off the bench after he lost his starting spot to Dan Alberto. In 2015, he elected to skip his fifth and final playing year in the UAAP, and instead saw action in the PBA D-League team, Tanduay Light Rhum Masters and opted to apply for the draft later that year.

Professional career
Sumang was projected to be taken as early as the first round in different mock drafts, but to everyone's surprise, he was drafted in the third round (26th overall) by the GlobalPort Batang Pier in the 2015 PBA draft. His late selection in the draft drew reactions from fans, and was the top trending topic on Twitter that day. A few days later, he signed a two-year multi-million contract with GlobalPort. He and Rain or Shine guard and fellow UE alumnus Paul Lee shared the same agent and adviser in coach Lawrence Chongson.
He is the team's third-string point guard, playing behind Terrence Romeo and Stanley Pringle.

PBA career statistics

As of the end of 2022–23 season

Season-by-season averages

|-
| align=left rowspan=2| 
| align=left | GlobalPort
| rowspan=2|34 || rowspan=2|8.5 || rowspan=2|.405 || rowspan=2|.306 || rowspan=2|.615 || rowspan=2|1.0 || rowspan=2|.6 || rowspan=2|.4 || rowspan=2|– || rowspan=2|3.6
|-
| align=left | Blackwater
|-
| align=left | 
| align=left | Blackwater
| 29 || 19.9 || .432 || .317 || .840 || 2.0 || 2.8 || .8 || .0 || 9.0
|-
| align=left | 
| align=left | Blackwater
| 30 || 16.1 || .391 || .293 || .756 || 2.0 || 2.5 || .7 || .0 || 6.8
|-
| align=left | 
| align=left | Blackwater
| 36 || 23.7 || .432 || .295 || .797 || 2.7 || 4.1 || 1.3 || .2 || 7.9
|-
| align=left | 
| align=left | Blackwater
| 11 || 25.2 || .409 || .222 || .800 || 4.3 || 4.3 || 1.1 || .1 || 10.4
|-
| align=left | 
| align=left | NorthPort
| 5 || 28.3 || .484 || .286 || .875 || 2.6 || 5.0 || .6 || .2 || 8.2
|-
| align=left | 
| align=left | NorthPort
| 32 || 23.8 || .450 || .345 || .702 || 3.4 || 4.4 || 1.0 || .0 || 8.8
|-class=sortbottom
| align="center" colspan=2 | Career
| 177 || 19.1 || .426 || .308 || .768 || 2.4 || 3.0 || .9 || .1 || 7.4

References

1990 births
Living people
Basketball players from Manila
Blackwater Bossing players
Competitors at the 2013 Southeast Asian Games
Filipino men's basketball players
Maharlika Pilipinas Basketball League players
NorthPort Batang Pier draft picks
NorthPort Batang Pier players
People from Tondo, Manila
Philippines men's national basketball team players
Point guards
Southeast Asian Games gold medalists for the Philippines
Southeast Asian Games medalists in basketball
UE Red Warriors basketball players